Murat Köprülü is a Turkish American investment professional and philanthropist. He is currently advisor on Emerging Markets to four hedge fund groups based in New York. He is also the Chairman of the American Turkish Society, founded in 1949,  the oldest U.S.-based not-for-profit organization that seeks to enhance economic, diplomatic, cultural, and educational ties between the United States and Turkey.

Business career
Murat Köprülü's long tenure in investing in emerging markets since 1987 establishes him as a global expert in emerging markets; he has survived the emerging markets upheavals of 1991 recession, the 1994 Mexican peso crisis, the 1997 East Asia Crisis, the 1998 Russian financial crisis, the early 2000s recession, and the Global financial crisis of 2008. Köprülü began his career at the World Bank, where he started at the age of 19 as a part-time consultant in computer modeling for the Research Department, while he was going to college. He then worked from 1980 through 1983 at the Turkey Desk and the Egypt Desk. From 1983 to 1986, Köprülü was Managing Director of IntraLink, Ltd., an international trade finance advisory firm, which provided financing sources for international trade transactions in a diverse list of emerging countries such as Egypt, Ivory Coast,
Greece, Turkey, and the Philippines.

Köprülü was formerly CEO of Multilateral Funding International (MFI), a New York based emerging markets investment and financial advisory firm, which he founded in 1988, specializing in the regions comprising Eastern Europe, Russia, Turkey, Middle East, and Central Asia. He was also the  Managing Partner of MFI's brokerage affiliate, MFI Securities, L.P., trading in the capital markets of the same regions. In 2004, MFI established the Turkey Opportunity Fund to invest in Turkish equities. Köprülü is currently advisor on Emerging Markets to four hedge fund groups based in New York.

Köprülü is also one of the earliest members of the Bretton Woods Committee. He was presented with an Award of Excellence in 2004 from the International Center in New York. He wrote a seminal piece in the Bretton Woods Newsletter in September 2015 outlining his thesis that the emerging, growing global debt crisis of 2015-2016 would change the economies of the major world countries in significant ways.

Philanthropy
Köprülü's charitable work has mainly focused on strengthening educational and cultural ties between the U.S. and Turkey. He is the Chairman of The American Turkish Society. He is the Chairman of The American Turkish Society. He assumed this position in June 2007 after the passing of Ahmet Ertegun, the previous chairman of The Society, a prominent Turkish-American businessman and musician, and the founder of Atlantic Records, in 2006.

The American Turkish Society’s mission is to enhance business, economic, diplomatic, and cultural ties between Turkey and the United States. The Society convenes leaders in government, business, and civil society to discuss and advance U.S.-Turkish relations; fosters understanding and cooperation between the two countries through education, cultural exchange, philanthropy, and networking; informs the American public about Turkey’s current affairs, economy, history, and society; presents and supports programs highlighting Turkish arts and culture through its cultural outfit, Moon and Stars Project; organizes the annual New York Turkish Film Festival; and nurtures the next generation of leaders through its "Young Society Leaders" program.

Additionally, The Society has hosted annual gala dinners since 2006 to highlight and celebrate successful economic partnerships between the United States and Turkey and honor extraordinary business leaders who exemplify U.S.-Turkish friendship. Proceeds from the gala dinner support the American Turkish Society's wide-ranging educational and cultural programs.

The 2013 Benefit Gala, held at the New York Stock Exchange, celebrated U.S.-Turkish financial ties and honored U.S. Secretary of Commerce Penny Pritzker and Turkey Finance Minister Mehmet Simsek.

The 2015 Benefit Gala held at the Pierre Hotel Ballroom in New York City, celebrated the philanthropic and humanitarian achievements of two honorees: Hamdi Ulukaya, founder and CEO of Chobani  of the USA, and Husnu Ozyegin, founder and CEO of Fiba Holding of Turkey.

In early 2016 Mr. Koprulu founded and was elected Chairman of The American Immigrant Society with a group of fellow American immigrant citizens.  The American Immigrant Society encompasses every country of origin, every ethnicity, every culture and every religion, which is of course the “Melting Pot” that has always defined the nation. The American Immigrant Society believes that America has benefited tremendously throughout its history by welcoming tens of millions of immigrants and refugees from over 95 countries; that the nation is justly proud and lucky to have its extraordinary, hard-working, tenacious immigrant heritage, and must protect and enhance it for a prosperous future. The American Immigrant Society changes the negative narrative, challenges the stereotypes of America's most admired asset throughout the world. The American Immigrant Society seeks also to unite the nation’s major ethnic societies, and facilitate collaboration among leading non-profits committed to improving our celebration of the nation’s immigrant heritage.

He is also a long-time supporter/sponsor of Children International and Children USA, Feeding America, EMPower, SCS Children's Villages, Holy Apostles Soup Kitchen, U.S. Armed Forces – Iraq and Afghanistan Casualty Appeal, Salvation Army of Manhattan, Project Hope, Project Renewal of New York, CARE, City Harvest of New York, Coalition for the Homeless NYC, Goodwill Industries of NY/NJ, the Endometriosis Foundation of America, CityMeals-On-Wheels, New York Cares, and UNICEF.

Education and personal life
Köprülü holds a Bachelor of Science in Mathematics and Economics from the University of Maryland, a Master of Science in Economics from the London School of Economics and an M.Phil in International Trade and Finance from Columbia University. He is an expert on Middle East geopolitics & conflict, and is a frequent media commentator on emerging market economies, Turkey, and U.S.-Turkey relations. He is proficient in Spanish and fluent in English, Turkish and French.

Murat Köprülü has completed five New York City Marathons, two Bosphorus Swim Competitions, three Narragansett Bay Swim Competitions, [and, most recently], the Hunter Mountain Olympic Triathlon in September 2013. He received the Top Fundraiser Award honoring the highest Fundraiser for the New York City Marathon for Team NY Rotary in 2011. He completed the BikeMS biking competition in New York City for the National MS Society  in October 2015, and completed the TCS New York City Marathon in November 2015, running for the benefit of the New York-based charity,CityMeals-on-Wheels, and raising the most donor funds as the team runner.

He also recently finished the New York City Triathlon in July 2016, competing on behalf of the National Multiple Sclerosis Society  and becoming their top fundraiser for the triathlon.  

Köprülü is a descendant of the Köprülü family, a  noble family of the Ottoman Empire. His father, Ertuğrul Mehmet Köprülü (1921-1983), was a Turkish diplomat to the U.S. and his grand uncle, Mehmet Fuat Köprülü (1890-1966), was a Turkish politician and historian, known for his contributions to Ottoman history, Turkish folklore, and Turkish language.

References

External links
 Murat Köprülü executive biography at The American Turkish Society organizational web site
Video from Bloomberg Habertürk, "Murat Köprülü on the Activities of The American Turkish Society"
Audio Clip from Bloomberg News, "Koprulu Discusses Fundamentals in Emerging Markets"
 2015 Citymeals-on-Wheels NYC Marathon
 http://brettonwoods.org/page/september-2015-e-bulletin

American chief executives of financial services companies
American nonprofit businesspeople
Turkish businesspeople
American people of Turkish descent
Businesspeople from New York City
Living people
Year of birth missing (living people)